DAV Centenary Public School, Bhawanathpur Township { or DAV BNP T/S (SAIL) } is an educational institution in Jharkhand, India, located in bhawnathpur township Garhwa district. It is a co-educational school and features education from the Prep to Senior Secondary levels. It is affiliated with the Central Board of Secondary Education, New Delhi, and is managed by DAV College Managing Committee.

The school was founded in 1985 under the guidance and sponsorship of Steel Authority of India Limited (SAIL) has over 2500 students. The curriculum is based on CBSE directives, with the guidance of the DAV College Managing Committee.

References 

http://yellowpages.sulekha.com/school-finder/bihar/garhwa/schools/bhawanathpur-township/d-a-v-public-school.htm
http://wikimapia.org/2113767/DAV-Centenary-Public-School
http://www.onlineschooladmissions.com/school/dav_centenary_public_school_bhawanathpur_township/garhwa/jharkhand/india/22829
https://www.facebook.com/davbnp
Dayanand_Anglo-Vedic_Schools_System
 

1985 establishments in Bihar
Educational institutions established in 1985
Garhwa district
High schools and secondary schools in Jharkhand